Don't Fight the Feeling is the seventh EP by South Korean–Chinese boy band Exo. It was released by SM Entertainment on June 7, 2021, and marketed as a "special album" and a gift for fans.  The album marks the group's first new material since their 2019 studio album Obsession, and features the return of members Xiumin, Lay, and D.O. since Don't Mess Up My Tempo (2018). Don't Fight the Feeling topped the Gaon Album Chart and has sold over one million copies, the sixth among Exo's albums to have reached this milestone.

Background and release
In mid-2020, two Exo members–Chen and Suho–went on hiatus to enlist for their mandatory military service. A few months later, two previously enlisted members–Xiumin and D.O.–who had been inactive since the group's fifth studio album Don't Mess Up My Tempo (2018), were discharged and resumed activities with the group.

On May 10, Exo announced the release of a "special album" titled Don't Fight the Feeling. Beginning on May 24, futuristic promotional images and videos for the EP were gradually released. On May 26, Lay, who had also been inactive since Don't Mess Up My Tempo, was announced to have participated on the project. Lay did not meet up with the members at any point working on the album as a result of the COVID-19 pandemic. On June 7, Don't Fight the Feeling and the music video for the title track were released simultaneously.

Don't Fight the Feeling contains five tracks including the title track, which was described as a dance song with a "cheerful rhythm". Physically, the EP was released in four editions, including two photobook editions, a jewel case edition, and an Expansion edition. The Expansion edition itself has six versions, each featuring one of the participating members–minus Lay–on the cover.

Commercial performance
Prior to its release, Don't Fight the Feeling received 1.2 million pre-orders within a 27-day period, breaking Exo's previous personal record of 1.1 million with Don't Mess Up My Tempo (2018). On June 14, eight days after being released, the album was announced to have sold over one million copies, surpassing Don't Mess Up My Tempo–which took ten days to do so–to become Exo's fastest-selling album. This is the group's sixth album to have crossed the one million sales mark.

Don't Fight the Feeling debuted at number one on the Gaon Album Chart. In Japan, it peaked at number three on the Oricon Albums Chart, and at number six on the Billboard Japan Hot Albums chart. In the US, the album debuted at number eight on the Billboard World Albums chart.

Track listing

Charts

Weekly charts

Year-end charts

Certifications and sales

Accolades

Release history

References

2021 EPs
Exo EPs
Korean-language EPs
SM Entertainment EPs